Luciano Tovoli,  (born 30 October 1936) is an Italian cinematographer and filmmaker. With a career spanning over five decades, he is considered one of Italy's premier cinematographers, collaborating with numerous acclaimed filmmakers such as Michelangelo Antonioni, Francis Veber, Dario Argento, Ettore Scola, Andrei Tarkovsky, and Julie Taymor.

Films that Tovoli has photographed include The Passenger (1975), Suspiria (1977), Titus (1999). He has been a longtime collaborator of Barbet Schroeder, having worked with the Iranian-born filmmaker's Reversal of Fortune (1990), Single White Female (1992), Before and After (1996), Murder by Numbers (2002), and Inju: The Beast in the Shadow (2008). He is a member of the American, Italian Society of Cinematographers, and an honorary member of the Swedish Society of Cinematographers and the European Federation of Cinematographers.

In 1983, Tovoli directed and cowrote Il Generale dell'armata morte based on a novel by Ismail Kadare, starring Marcello Mastroianni and Anouk Aimée.

Filmography

1960s

1970s

1980s

1990s

2000s

2010s

References

External links
 
 Luciano Tovoli interview: 

1936 births
Italian film directors
Italian cinematographers
Living people
David di Donatello winners
People from Massa Marittima